Lieskovany is a tiny village and municipality in the Spišská Nová Ves District in the Košice Region of central-eastern Slovakia.

History
In historical records the village was first mentioned in 1277.

Geography
The village lies at an altitude of 434 metres and covers an area of 1.759 km². In 2011 it had a population of 296 inhabitants.

External links
http://en.e-obce.sk/obec/lieskovany/lieskovany.html
https://web.archive.org/web/20070513023228/http://www.statistics.sk/mosmis/eng/run.html
http://www.lieskovany.ocu.sk

Villages and municipalities in Spišská Nová Ves District